Laminin subunit alpha-5 is a protein that in humans is encoded by the LAMA5 gene.

Function 

Components of the extracellular matrix exert myriad effects on tissues throughout the body. In particular, the laminins, a family of heterotrimeric extracellular glycoproteins, affect tissue development and integrity in such diverse organs as the kidney, lung, skin, and nervous system. It is thought that laminins mediate the attachment, migration, and organization of cells into tissues during embryonic development by interacting with other extracellular matrix components. Laminins function as heterotrimeric complexes of alpha, beta, and gamma chains, with each chain type representing a different subfamily of proteins. The protein encoded by this gene belongs to the alpha subfamily of laminin chains and is a major component of basement membranes. Two transcript variants encoding different isoforms have been found for this gene, but the full-length nature of one of them has not been determined.

Interactions 

Laminin, alpha 5 has been shown to interact with BCAM.

References

Further reading 

 
 
 
 
 
 
 
 
 
 
 
 
 
 
 
 
 
 

Laminins